D28 may refer to:

Ships 
 , a Pará-class destroyer of the Brazilian Navy
 , a Garcia-class destroyer of the Brazilian Navy
 , a V-class destroyer of the Royal Navy
 , a Fletcher-class destroyer of the Hellenic Navy

Other uses 
 D28 road (Croatia)
 Dewoitine D.28, a French aircraft
 Martin D-28, a guitar model
 Sonatensatz, D 28 (Schubert), a piano work by Franz Schubert
 Iceberg D-28, which calved from the Amery Ice Shelf in Antarctica in September 2019
 LNER Class D28, a class of British steam locomotives